Push Pop (manufactured by Topps) is an American brand of fruit-flavored lollipops produced in Taiwan (and other Southeast Asian countries). It is a product of the Topps Company Inc. It debuted in 1986 and comes in many flavors.

Overview
The product's gimmick is that the lollipop takes the form of a long cylinder that retracts into a capped plastic tube, and must be "pushed" out for consumption. Push Pop varieties include Original, spring-loaded Jumbo, Triple Power, Flip-N-Dip, push pop sliderz, and Push Pump Spray.

In 2020, the Push Pop Gummy Roll was added to the line of Push Pop candies. The gummy roll comes in a tape-like dispenser that allows the consumer to pull out a strand of the roll and tear it off to get their desired piece of sanded gummy candy. This new Push pop candy comes in 4 different flavors: Strawberry, Watermelon, Blue Raspberry, and Berry Blast. Creating gummy candy was a bit of a departure for Push Pop, as the brand focuses on creating a fun experience for eating lollipops. The Push Pop Gummy Roll was first announced in May 2019 at the Sweets & Snacks Expo in Chicago.

It has proven to be a popular product with kids, winning the Candy Industry Kid’s Choice award for Best Novelty candy.

Slogans 
Don't Push ME, push a Push Pop!
Isn't Time You Pushed A Push Pop?
Give life a push.
Push a Push Pop, push it for flavor, push a Push Pop, save some for later!
What? You never pushed a Push Pop?

References

External links
 

Brand name confectionery
Topps confectionery products
Lollipops
Products introduced in 1986